Chishma-Urakayevo (Şişmä-Uraqay) is a rural locality (a village) in Arbashevsky Selsoviet, Askinsky District, Bashkortostan, Russia. The population was 245 as of 2010. There are 6 streets.

Geography 
Chishma-Urakayevo is located 28 km south of Askino (the district's administrative centre) by road. Arbashevo is the nearest rural locality.

References 

Rural localities in Askinsky District